Anna-Lena Grönefeld and Vania King were the defending champions, but they lost to Timea Bacsinszky and Tathiana Garbin in the first round.

Andrea Hlaváčková and Lucie Hradecká won in the final 2–6, 7–6(3), 10–4, against Melinda Czink and Arantxa Parra Santonja.

Seeds

  Alla Kudryavtseva /  Ekaterina Makarova (first round)
  Anna-Lena Grönefeld /  Vania King (first round)
  Akgul Amanmuradova /  Chan Yung-jan (semifinals)
  Klaudia Jans /  Alicja Rosolska (first round)

Draw

Draw

External links
Main Draw Doubles

Doubles
2010 WTA Tour